Phulwari or Phulwari Sharif is Block and town in Patna district in the Indian state of Bihar. The current metro plan of Patna has one route in Phulwari Sharif.It includes in Patna Metropolitan Region and one of the fastest growing area of urban Patna.The civilisation of the city dates back to the days of inception of the Sufi culture in India. Phulwari Sharif had been frequented by most Sufi saints of that period.Phulwari sharif is famous for its islamic spiritual dargah and old mosques. 

All India Institute of Medical Sciences Patna (AIIMS Patna) is located in Phulwari Sharif.
Urbanisation has taken over Phulwari Sharif and now it is the most populated area of Patna. Phulwari Sharif is one of the Muslim-majority areas within Patna.

Geography
Phulwari Sharif is located at

Demographics

As of the 2011 Indian census, Phulwari Sharif had a total population of 81,740, of which 42,840 were males and 38,900 were females. Population within the age group of 0 to 6 years was 12,186. The total number of literates in Phulwari Sharif was 55,265, which constituted 67.6% of the population with male literacy of 71.6% and female literacy of 63.2%. The effective literacy rate of 7+ population of Phulwari Sharif was 79.5%, of which male literacy rate was 83.8% and female literacy rate was 74.6%. The Scheduled Castes and Scheduled Tribes population was 6,561 and 141 respectively. Phulwari Sharif had 13,404 households in 2011.

As of the 2001 Indian census, Phulwari Sharif had a population of 53,166. Males constitute 53% of the population and females 47%. In Phulwari Sharif, 8,153 (15.3%) of the population was in the age range of 0 to 6 years. The total number of literates in Phulwari Sharif was 33,583, which gives a crude literacy rate of 63.2%. The effective literacy rate of people 7 years and above was 74.6%.

Tourism

Mazar of Hazrat Makhdoom Rasti, Khanqah Mujeebia, Sheesh Mahal, Shahi Sangi Masjid and Imarat Sharia have a long religious history that is intensely attached with the birth and development of the Sufi culture in India. The founder of Khanquah Mujeebia, Phulwari Sharif is Hazrat Tajul Aarfeen Makhdoom Shah Mujeebullah Quadri. This monastery has been named as Khanquah Mujeebia related to his name. This great sufi was born in 1098 A.H. i.e. 1688 A.D. and breathed his last in 1191 A.H. i.e. 1778 A.D. His grave is under a tomb of the garden of Khanquah Mujeebia. The Sufi saints of the ancient times made the state of Bihar one of the important centers of religious, social, and cultural developments, and Phulwari Sharif was one such region where the Sufi saints had spread their message of love and tolerance, and the same can be felt here in the atmosphere; people of all religions respect each others.

The Shahi Sangi Masjid bears relics of the rich architectural past of the region. Built in red sandstone by the Mughal Emperor Humayun, it is the one of the oldest mosques in Phulwari Sharif. The mosque is one of the main attractions for tourists. Near the mosque there is a shrine of Khwaja Emaduddin Qalandar. Also it is known as Lal Miyan ki Dargah.

Each year on 29-Dhu al-Hijjah there is an Urs at the Mazar of Shah Makhdoom Rasti Rahmatullah Allaih and disciples from all over India came here to tribute and get spiritual satisfaction.

Transport
Phulwari Sharif is well connected to other cities of India through rail-road network.

Road
Phulwari Sharif is located on NH 139 on the AIIMS Road in Patna.

Rail
Phulwari Sharif railway station connects the city to different part of the country through many passenger and express trains.

Airways

Lok Nayak Jay Prakash Narayan Airport is nearby Phulwari Sharif which connects Patna to all other part of country.

Administration

Phulwari Sharif has turned into a prominent city and a notified area of the Patna. Under the plan of Greater Patna it will also come under Patna Municipal Corporation.

Politics

Shyam Rajak, a member of the Janata Dal United (JDU) party, won the Phulwari seat (assembly constituency no. 188), reserved for scheduled castes, thrice after losing once to Rashtriya Janta Dal candidate. Representing Janata Dal in 1995, he defeated Sanjeev Prasad Toni of Congress. Sanjeev Prasad Toni of Congress won the seat thrice, defeating Vidyanand Vikal of IPF in 1990, and Dashrath Paswan of the CPI in 1985 and 1980. Ram Prit Paswan of Janata Party defeated Dasrath Paswan of CPI in 1977. The Phulwari assembly constituency is part of Pataliputra (Lok Sabha constituency).

List of villages
The list of villages in ''Phulwari Block (under Patna Sadar Tehsil) is as follows: 
 Bhusaula Danapur 
 Chilbilli
 Dhiwara
 Gonpura
 Koriayawan
 Kurkuri
 Kurthoul
 Menpura Anda
 Nohsa
 Persa
 Rampur Faridpur
 Sakraicha
 Shorampur
 Suitha

References

Cities and towns in Patna district
Neighbourhoods in Patna